The 1986–87 DDR-Oberliga season was the 39th season of the DDR-Oberliga, the top level of ice hockey in East Germany. Two teams participated in the league, and SC Dynamo Berlin won the championship.

Game results

1st series 

Dynamo Weißwasser wins series 2 games to 1.

2nd series

Dynamo Berlin wins series 3 games to 1.

3rd series 

Dynamo Berlin wins series 3 games to 0, and wins the overall series 2-1.

References

External links
East German results 1970-1990

1986–87
Ger
Oberliga
1986 in East German sport
1987 in East German sport